Doug Cameron (Australia) was a rugby league footballer in the New South Wales Rugby League competition.

A halfback, Cameron played for the Eastern Suburbs club in late 1950s before finishing his league career at Young, playing for the 'Cherry Pickers' in rural New South Wales.

Cameron was also a representative of NSW during his career.

References
The Encyclopedia Of Rugby League players. Alan Whiticker & Glen Hudson

Australian rugby league players
Sydney Roosters players
Living people
Year of birth missing (living people)
Place of birth missing (living people)